Zyak-Ishmetovo (Zäk-İşmät) is a rural locality (a selo) and the administrative centre of Zyak-Ishmetovsky Selsoviet, Kuyurgazinsky District, Bashkortostan, Russia. The population was 682 as of 2010. There are 6 streets.

Geography 
Zyak-Ishmetovo is located 45 km northwest of Yermolayevo (the district's administrative centre) by road. Maryevka is the nearest rural locality.

References 

Rural localities in Kuyurgazinsky District